The Cégep de Rimouski is a post-secondary education institution (cégep: College of General and Professional Education) located in Rimouski, Quebec, Canada.

History
The college traces its origins to the merger of several institutions which became public ones in 1967, when the Quebec system of CEGEPs was created.

Programs
Quebec students complete one fewer grade than all other Canadian provinces in total before attending CEGEP, by ending high school in grade 11 instead of grade 12. CEGEPs then prepare students for university or to enter a technical profession. It is also possible to attend a university with a 3-year technical CEGEP diploma.

The Province of Quebec awards a Diploma of Collegial Studies for two types of programs: two years of pre-university studies or three years of vocational (technical) studies. The pre-university programs, which take two years to complete, cover the subject matters which roughly correspond to the additional year of high school given elsewhere in Canada in preparation for a chosen field in university. The technical programs, which take three-years to complete, applies to students who wish to pursue a skilled trade.

See also
List of colleges in Quebec 
Higher education in Quebec

References

External links
  Cégep de Rimouski
  Institut maritime du Québec
  Cégep de Rimouski Student Association
  City of Rimouski

Rimouski
Education in Rimouski